Mario Imperoli  (24 June 1931 - 24 December 1977) was an Italian director, producer, screenwriter and journalist.

Born in Rome, Imperoli started his career as a journalist for several magazines and newspapers. He entered the cinema industry in 1970, as the screenwriter and producer of the Vittorio De Sisti's giallo L'interrogatorio. He later directed eight films, often characterized by erotic themes. He directed Gloria Guida in her debut film, Monika.

Filmography
 Mia moglie, un corpo per l'amore (1972)
 Monika (La ragazzina, 1974)
 Snapshot of a Crime (Istantanea per un delitto, 1974)
 Blue Jeans (1975)
 Le dolci zie (1975)
 Like Rabid Dogs (Come cani arrabbiati, 1976)
 Quella strana voglia d'amare (1977)
 Canne mozze (1977)

References

External links 
 

1931 births
1977 deaths
Journalists from Rome
Italian male journalists
Italian film directors
Italian film producers
20th-century Italian screenwriters
Italian male screenwriters
Film people from Rome
Giallo film directors
20th-century Italian journalists
20th-century Italian male writers